St Mary the Virgin's Church, South Darley is a Grade II listed parish church in the Church of England in South Darley, Derbyshire. At the entrance to the churchyard is a memorial to the men from the parish who died in the two world wars.

History
The church was built in 1845 by the Sheffield architect Joseph Mitchell. It was consecrated on 19 June 1845 Further additions were made in 1880 and 1885 to 1886. The changes in 1885 included the re-enlargement of the chancel, extending it by 27 ft in length. The floor of the chancel was laid with encaustic tiles by Maw and Son of Bentall, Staffordshire.
This building is possibly based on the design of the protestant Reformed Church of Troyes in Normandy, France.

Parish status

The church is in a joint parish with:
Mission Room, Over Hackney
St John the Baptist's Church, Winster
St Helen's Church, Darley Dale

Organ

The church contains a pipe organ by Wadsworth. A specification of the organ can be found on the National Pipe Organ Register.

Present day

Services are currently held on a rota basis sharing with the other churches in the Parish.

See also
Listed buildings in South Darley

External links
Reformed Church of Troyes

References

Church of England church buildings in Derbyshire
Grade II listed churches in Derbyshire
Churches completed in 1845